Falls Creek is a river in Delaware County in the state of New York. It begins east of the hamlet of Meredith and flows in a generally southeast direction before flowing into the West Branch Delaware River north-northeast of the village of Delhi. Watauga Falls is a waterfall located on the creek.

Tributaries
Honest Brook flows into Falls Creek north of Delhi.

References

Rivers of New York (state)
Rivers of Delaware County, New York
Tributaries of the West Branch Delaware River